Dirt is a blanket term for unclean matter.

Dirt may also refer to:
 Soil, that is found on the ground

Literature
 Dirt (novel), the second novel in the Stone Barrington series by Stuart Woods
 Dirt: The Erosion of Civilizations, a non-fiction book by David R. Montgomery
 The Dirt, 2001 autobiography of American hard rock band Mötley Crüe
 Dirt (magazine), an American lifestyle magazine for young men

Film and TV
 Dirt (1965 film), directed by Piero Heliczer and produced by Andy Warhol
 Dirt (1994 film), a Chinese film directed by Guan Hu
 Dirt (1998 film), directed by Chel White
 Dirt (2003 film), directed by Nancy Savoca
 Dirt (TV series)
 Dirt! The Movie, a 2009 ecological documentary
 The Dirt (film), a 2019 American biopic Mötley Crüe film
 Dirt, a web series by the Brat network

Racing and games
 Dirt jumping, the practice of riding bikes over jumps
 Dirt (series), a series of rally racing video games
 Dirt (MUD), a major derivative of the AberMUD online game server software

Music
 DIRT (band), an early-1980s UK anarcho-punk band

Albums
 Dirt (Alice in Chains album), 1992, or its title track
 Dirt (The Arrogant Worms album), 1999
 D.I.R.T. (Heltah Skeltah album), 2008
 Dirt (Kids in Glass Houses album), 2010
 Dirt (Dean Brody album), 2012

Songs
 "Dirt" (song), a 2014 song by Florida Georgia Line
 "The Dirt" (song), a song by Benjamin Ingrosso
 "Dirt", a song from Christie Front Drive's self-titled EP, 1994
 "Dirt", a song from Emma Blackery's album Villains, 2018
 "Dirt", a song from Phish's album Farmhouse, 2000
 "Dirt", a song from The Stooges' album Fun House, 1970

Others
 Dirt cake, a dessert food made of chocolate pudding and Oreos
 Dirt, slang for gossip, blackmail or slander against a person

Acronyms
 DIRT, Interval training: Distance, Interval, Repetitions, Time
 DIRT, Deposit interest retention tax, a form of tax in the Republic of Ireland

See also
 Dirty (disambiguation)
 Joe Dirt, a 2001 American cult film starring David Spade